The United States House of Representative elections of 1996 in North Carolina were held on 5 November 1996 as part of the biennial election to the United States House of Representatives.  All twelve seats in North Carolina, and 435 nationwide, were elected.

The Democrats made strong gains, recouping much of the losses sustained in the Republican Revolution of 1994, in which the Republicans had gained four districts.  In 1996, parties won six representatives from the state.  Two Republican incumbents first elected in 1994 – Fred Heineman in the 4th district and David Funderburk in the 2nd – failed to hold their seats.

It is not to be confused with the election to the North Carolina House of Representatives, which was held on the same day.

Summary

Results

Footnotes

1996
1996 North Carolina elections